Journey Through the Shadows is the sixth album by South African rock band the Parlotones. It was produced by Theo Crous, and was released on 8 May 2012 by Sovereign Entertainment. They recorded the entire album in 2011 at M3 Studios in Johannesburg. The album includes their successful radio singles, "Save Your Best Bits" and "Honey Spiders".

Track listing

Personnel
Kahn Morbee – lead vocals, rhythm guitar
Paul Hodgson – lead guitar
Glen Hodgson – bass guitar, backing vocals
Neil Pauw – drums

References

2012 albums
The Parlotones albums